Bounder may refer to:
Bounder (character), a dishonorable man
Bounder (video game), a 1985 computer game
The Bounder, a television show
Myasishchev M-50 (NATO reporting name "Bounder"), a Soviet Union prototype bomber aircraft
 Pseudonym of Jon Bounds